Carry Fire is the eleventh solo studio album by English rock singer, songwriter and musician Robert Plant, released on 13 October 2017 on Nonesuch/Warner Bros. Records. It is the second studio album on which Plant is backed by the Sensational Space Shifters.

Reception

Carry Fire received positive reviews from critics. On Metacritic, the album holds a score of 84/100 based on 15 reviews, indicating "universal acclaim".
The album was selected as the 37th best album of 2017 by Rolling Stone magazine.
The album was honoured as the best selling UK Americana album at the 2018 UK Americana Awards.

Track listing
Source:

Personnel
Musicians
Robert Plant – vocals, production 
The Sensational Space Shifters (as backing band): 
Justin Adams - guitar, oud
Liam "Skin" Tyson - guitar
John Baggott - keyboards
Billy Fuller - bass guitar
Dave Smith - drums
Seth Lakeman – viola, fiddle
Redi Hasa – cello
Chrissie Hynde - vocals

Charts

Weekly charts

Year-end charts

References

2017 albums
Nonesuch Records albums
Robert Plant albums
Warner Records albums